Liberty is a ghost town in San Joaquin County, in the U.S. state of California.

History
Liberty was established in 1852. A post office was opened at Liberty in 1860, and remained in operation until 1874. With the construction of the railroad in the late 1860s, business activity shifted to nearby Galt, and the town's population dwindled.  The Liberty cemetery, East of highway 99 at Liberty Road is now cared for by the Galt Historical Society.

References

Geography of San Joaquin County, California